"Who Threw That Ham at Me" is the third single by The Superions, a side project of Fred Schneider of The B-52s.  The single was released to iTunes Stores as a digital download on November 24, 2009, ironically, the day after celebrity chef Paula Deen was hit in the face with a flying ham while helping pass out hams for charity in Atlanta.  A remix by Casper & The Cookies (featuring Jason NeSmith, former member of Of Montreal) was also released on The Superions EP by Happy Happy Birthday To Me Records as a digital download on January 19, 2010, the CD and Limited Edition 12" were released on February 23, 2010.

The song's concept comes from an often racist urban legend or series of anecdotes concerning audacious thieves who attempt to deflect guilt by proposing that rather than perpetrators of shoplifting, they are victims, having been attacked with the item. The song's humorous take contains no elements of racism and other objects including ham.

Track listing
 "Who Threw That Ham at Me" 3:46

Personnel 
Band
 Fred Schneider - vocals
 Noah Brodie - keyboards
 Dan Marshall - programming

Production
 Producer: The Superions
 Mastering: Bob Katz at Digital Domain
 Additional Mixing: Wally Walton at Greg Rike Productions
 Management: Dave Brodie
 Artwork: Dan Marshall (ham created with the Scribble App for iPhone)

Music video
A music video was filmed in Baltimore on November 7, 2009 at the American Visionary Art Museum and Eddie's grocery store.  The video features shoplifting, the Disco Garbage Can dance, Fred Schneider as one of the three judges, and cameos by PJ DeBoy and Paul Dawson.  The video premiered on YouTube on February 16, 2010.

References

External links
 Who Threw That Ham At Me - Single on iTunes
 

The Superions songs
2009 songs
Songs written by Fred Schneider